Shayeq (also Romanized as Shāyeq) is a village in the Central District of Sareyn County, Ardabil Province, Iran. At the 2006 census, its population was 923 in 190 families.

References 

Tageo

Towns and villages in Sareyn County